Dilan Kumar Markanday (born 20 August 2001) is an English professional footballer who plays as a winger for Scottish Premiership club Aberdeen, on loan from EFL Championship side Blackburn Rovers.

Career
Markanday is a youth academy graduate of Tottenham Hotspur. On 19 January 2021, he extended his contract with the club until June 2022. He made his professional debut on 21 October 2021 in a 1–0 UEFA Europa Conference League away defeat against Vitesse. In doing so, he became the first British Asian, as well as the first player of Indian descent, to appear for Tottenham's men's first team in a competitive match.

On 18 January 2022, EFL Championship club Blackburn Rovers announced the signing of Markanday on a three-and-a-half-year deal, with an option to extend for twelve months. He scored his first goal for the club on 10 August 2022 in a 4–0 EFL Cup win over Hartlepool United.

On 31 January 2023, Markanday joined Scottish Premiership club Aberdeen on a loan deal until the end of the season.

Personal life
Born in England, Markanday is of Indian origin. He attended the Haberdasher's Boys' School in Elstree.

Career statistics

References

External links
 Tottenham Hotspur Profile
 

2001 births
Living people
English people of Indian descent
Footballers from the London Borough of Barnet
Association football forwards
English footballers
Tottenham Hotspur F.C. players
Blackburn Rovers F.C. players
British Asian footballers
British sportspeople of Indian descent
Scottish Professional Football League players
Aberdeen F.C. players